The Veliocasses or Velocasses (Gaulish: *Weliocassēs) were a Belgic or Gallic tribe of the La Tène and Roman periods, dwelling in the south of modern Seine-Maritime and in the north of Eure.

Name 
They are mentioned as Veliocasses by Caesar (mid-1st c. BC) and Pliny (1st c. AD), and as Velocasses by Orosius (early 5th c. AD).

The meaning of the Gaulish ethnonym is uncertain. The first part is certainly the Gaulish root , which could either stem from Proto-Celtic  ('modesty'; cf. OIr. , OBret.  'honestas'), or else from Proto-Celtic  ('better'; cf. Welsh  'better'). The second etymology is semantically more probable for a tribal name, but the unknown length of the vowel e in uelio- makes it difficult to conclude with certainty. The meaning of the second element -casses, attested in other Gaulish ethnonyms such as Bodiocasses, Durocasses, Sucasses, Tricasses, or Viducasses, has been debated, but it probably signifies '(curly) hair, hairstyle' (cf. Old Irish  'curl'), perhaps referring to a particular warrior coiffure. Patrizia de Bernardo Stempel has proposed to interpret the name as 'those with better helmets'.

Geography 
The territory of the Veliocasses was located in the north and, limited extent, also in the south of the lower reaches of the Sequana (Seine) river. Their territory was situated between that of the Caletes and Bellovaci. Wooded heights constituted a natural frontier with the Bellovaci, where the latter dominated.

During the pre-Roman period, their capital was probably the oppidum of Camp de Calidou (near Caudebec), then Rotomagus (present-day Rouen) after the reign of Augustus (27 BC–14 AD). The settlement was an important harbour for exports to the British Island in the 2nd century AD.

History 
During the Gallic Wars (58–50 BC), the Veliocasses participated in the tribal coalition of the Belgae that resisted the Romans in 57 BC. In 52 they raised 3,000 men to support Vercingetorix, and fought alongside the Bellovaci in the final rebellion against Roman hegemony.

Culture 
As for the neighbouring Calates, whether the Veliocasses should be regarded as Gallic or Belgic is debatable.

References

Primary sources

Bibliography 

 
Historical Celtic peoples
Gauls
Tribes of pre-Roman Gaul
Belgae
Tribes involved in the Gallic Wars